Mary Hutton may refer to:

 Mary Hutton (activist), Australian founder of the Free the Bears Fund
 Mary Hutton (poet) (1794–1859), English writer from Yorkshire
 Mary Ann Hutton, Irish language scholar and writer